The Devil is a 1918 German silent mystery film directed by E. A. Dupont and starring Max Landa, Gustav Botz, and Tzwetta Tzatschewa.

Cast

References

Bibliography

External links

1918 films
Films of the Weimar Republic
German silent feature films
Films directed by E. A. Dupont
German mystery films
1918 mystery films
German black-and-white films
Silent mystery films
1910s German films